ISO 3166-2:UG is the entry for Uganda in ISO 3166-2, part of the ISO 3166 standard published by the International Organization for Standardization (ISO), which defines codes for the names of the principal subdivisions (e.g., provinces or states) of all countries coded in ISO 3166-1.

Currently for Uganda, ISO 3166-2 codes are defined for 4 geographical regions, 134 districts, and 1 city (the capital of the country, Kampala).

Each code consists of two parts, separated by a hyphen. The second part is either of the following:
 one letter: geographical regions
 three digits: districts and city

For the districts, the first digit indicates the geographical region where the district is in:
 1: Central
 2: Eastern
 3: Northern
 4: Western

Current codes
Subdivision names are listed as in the ISO 3166-2 standard published by the ISO 3166 Maintenance Agency (ISO 3166/MA).

Click on the button in the header to sort each column.

Geographical regions

Districts and cities

Changes
The following changes to the entry have been announced by the ISO 3166/MA since the first publication of ISO 3166-2 in 1998.  ISO stopped issuing newsletters in 2013.

Codes changed in Newsletter I-5

See also
 Subdivisions of Uganda
 FIPS region codes of Uganda

External links
 ISO Online Browsing Platform: UG
 Districts of Uganda, Statoids.com
 Evolution of Uganda's districts, The Independent

2:UG
ISO 3166-2
ISO 3166-2
Uganda geography-related lists